The Football Factory is a 2004 British sports drama film written by AJ Lovell and directed by Nick Love and starring Danny Dyer, Tamer Hassan, Frank Harper, Roland Manookian, Neil Maskell and Dudley Sutton. The film is loosely based on the novel of the same name by John King and the first foray into filmmaking by video game producers Rockstar Games (creators of games such as the Grand Theft Auto series, among others), credited as executive producers. The film was released in the United Kingdom on 14 May 2004.

In 2004, Chelsea F.C. football supporters' fanzine cfcuk produced a special edition, titled cfcuk - The Football Factory to coincide with the release of the film.

Plot
Tommy Johnson (Danny Dyer) is a member of a violent Chelsea hooligan firm. His friends and fellow hooligans include Tommy's best friend Rod King (Neil Maskell), the hot-tempered Billy Bright (Frank Harper), and impulsive younger members Zeberdee (Roland Manookian) and Raf (Calum MacNab). Tommy spends his days drinking, using drugs, womanising and fighting, much to the disappointment of his grandfather Bill Farrell (Dudley Sutton), a pensioner and veteran who plans to move to Australia with his best friend Albert (John Junkin).

Tommy has an epiphany about his lifestyle during a fight with the Tottenham hooligan firm. Tommy, Billy and Rod are arrested for assaulting two Stoke City fans whilst travelling to an away match. These actions draw the fury of Harris (Tony Denham), the leader of the Chelsea firm, whose attempts to keep order are thwarted by Billy's aggressive outbursts.

Rod begins a relationship with Tamara (Sophie Linfield), the court clerk at their arraignment, and she pressures him to skip his weekend meets. Zeberdee and his friend Raff accidentally burgle Billy's house and are forced to stand in his living room, whilst Billy's children throw darts at them. Billy deals with his increasing loneliness after he overhears Harris discussing his irrelevance. Bill's plan to retire to Australia are postponed when Albert dies the night before they are to leave.

Early in the film, Tommy is caught and held hostage by the brother of Sian (Michele Hallak), a girl he picked up at a club. He is saved when Rod hits the man on the head with a cricket bat. Sian's brother turns out to also be the brother of the rival Millwall firm's leader, Fred (Tamer Hassan), who then hunts Tommy down throughout the entire film. The film culminates in a pitched battle between the Chelsea and Millwall firms. Rod (after a few espressos and a line of cocaine), leaves a dinner with Tamara's parents after offending them, and attends the "meet". Tommy is severely beaten by Fred and a group of Millwall hooligans, and ends up in the hospital with Bill, who, in the meantime, has suffered a heart attack.

At the end of the film, a crippled Tommy decides that his place is at the firm with his friends, Bill gets cured and moves to Australia and Billy Bright is incarcerated for seven years after being arrested at the Millwall meet (whilst saving Harris from being arrested). Zeberdee is killed by a drug dealer whom he had previously mugged, fulfilling a recurring nightmare that tormented Tommy throughout the film.

Cast
Danny Dyer — Tommy Johnson, a disillusioned twenty-nine-year-old, who lives for the weekend football matches. The thrill of the big derby between Millwall and Chelsea leaves his life and head scrambled as he tries to pull himself out of his nightmare.
Frank Harper — Billy Bright is a man around forty, part of the older generation of the Firm. Throughout the film it is shown that he wants to be the leader of the firm but lacks the composure needed.
Neil Maskell — Rod, Tommy's best friend and sidekick, carelessly strolling along the path led by his mates.
Roland Manookian — Zeberdee, younger breed coming through the ranks of Chelsea, his life has already run into a cul-de-sac of crime and drugs. With nothing to lose and no one to look out for him, Zeberdee aspires to be a future top boy; unfortunately his naivety gets him into trouble.
Calum McNab — Raff, Zeberdee's best friend.
Tamer Hassan — Millwall Fred, the volatile head of the rival Millwall hooligan firm, an arch enemy of Chelsea. The trouble begins when Tommy gets caught having a 1 night stand with the sister of Fred’s best mate, and retribution is wanted.
Dudley Sutton — Bill Farrell, a representative of the older generation from a bygone era, a D-Day veteran in his late seventies, who lives out the remainder of his days with childhood friend Albert Moss; they plan to retire in Australia.
John Junkin — Albert Moss.
Jamie Foreman — A racist taxi driver, who is never afraid of letting his customers know his true feelings about society.
Tony Denham — Harris, the Chelsea firm's head, who runs it like a military team.
Sophie Linfield — Tamara, a court clerk who becomes Rod's girlfriend.
Michele Hallak — Sian, a girl at a nightclub who is picked up by Tommy and is revealed to be Fred's sister.
Kara Tointon — Tameka, Sian's friend at the nightclub.
Lin Blakley — Tamara's mother
Danny Kelly — Radio announcer
Pete Stevens — Radio announcer

Reception

Critical response 
The Football Factory received negative reviews. On the review aggregator website Rotten Tomatoes, 38% of 8 critics' reviews are positive, with an average rating of 4.70/10.

Box office 
The Football Factory grossed a total of £623,138 in the United Kingdom.

See also
The Real Football Factories
The Real Football Factories International
Football hooliganism

References

External links

 Official website
 
 
 Chelsea Football Fanzine

2004 films
2004 crime drama films
2000s sports drama films
British crime drama films
British sports drama films
British association football films
Films about drugs
Films about racism in the United Kingdom
Films set in London
Hood films
HanWay Films films
Vertigo Films films
Films directed by Nick Love
Football hooliganism in the United Kingdom
2000s English-language films
2000s American films
2000s British films